Amie may refer to:

Amie, an alternate spelling of the female personal name Amy
AMIE, the Associate Member of the Institution of Engineers, a professional certification given by India's Institution of Engineers
"Amie" (song), song from the 1972 album Bustin' Out by Pure Prairie League
"Amie", a song by artist Damien Rice
Amie, daughter of Massasoit and wife to Tispaquin
Amie Fern, a party member character from the video game Neverwinter Nights 2
Anglican Mission in England, a UK religious charity

See also

 Belle Amie (disambiguation)

Ami (disambiguation)
Ammi (disambiguation)
Amy (disambiguation)